William Chauncy Langdon (1831–1895) was a Protestant Episcopal clergyman and a prominent American proponent of the YMCA. His son by the same name (1871–1947) was an historian of pageants.

General references 

 Esolen, Anthony. 2020. “No Option: Clear Out the Rubble & Rebuild!” Touchstone: A Journal of Mere Christianity 33 (4): 28–38. 
 Hoefnagel, Dick & Virginia L. Close. "Charles N Haskins and the Woodward Room at Baker Library". Dartmouth College Library Bulletin.
 "William Chauncy Langdon." In Dictionary of American Biography. New York, NY: Charles Scribner's Sons, 1936. Gale In Context: Biography (accessed January 16, 2021). 
 Stefano Villani, “William Chauncey Langdon e l’attività del Comitato sulla Riforma italiana della Chiesa Protestante Episcopale negli Stati Uniti d’America (1865-1874),” Protestantesimo, 73 (2018), pp. 129-186.

External links
Grave in Providence, Rhode Island

American clergy
American Episcopalians
1831 births
1895 deaths